The Metropolitan Archdiocese of Shillong is a Roman Catholic archdiocese in the state of Meghalaya, in northeastern India. The Archdiocese of Shillong is the metropolitan diocese of the Province of Shillong, an ecclesiastical province in  Northeast India. It serves  342,169 followers in 35 parishes in the districts of East Khasi Hills and Ri Bhoi of Meghalaya.

History
 Established on 15 December 1889 as the Apostolic Prefecture of Assam on territory split off from the Diocese of Krishnagar
 9 July 1934: Promoted as Diocese of Shillong
 Lost territory on 12 July 1951 to establish the Roman Catholic Diocese of Dibrugarh
 Lost territory again on 16 January 1964 to establish the Roman Catholic Diocese of Tezpur
 26 June 1969: Promoted as  Metropolitan Archdiocese of Gauhati–Shillong
 22 January 1970: Renamed as  Metropolitan Archdiocese of Shillong–Gauhati
 Lost territory to establish the Roman Catholic Diocese of Tura on 1973.03.01 and again on 1983.12.05 to establish the Roman Catholic Diocese of Diphu
 30 March 1992: Renamed as Metropolitan Archdiocese of Shillong
 Lost territory on 28 January 2006 to establish the Roman Catholic Diocese of Nongstoin and the Roman Catholic Diocese of Jowai

Cathedrals 
The cathedral of the Archdiocese is the Cathedral of Mary Help of Christians, in Shillong. It was built over 50 years ago. This place of worship stands on the very site of the first Church built by the German fathers (Salvatorians from Germany).
 
The earlier 1913 building – the Church of the Divine Saviour – was a wooden structure. 
It was destroyed in the Good Friday fire of 10 April 1936. Built by the first Catholic missionaries to set foot on these hills, the Salvatorians from Germany, it was the first Catholic Cathedral in what was then the Mission of Assam.

Ordinaries 

 Apostolic Prefects of Assam

 Fr. Otto Hopfenmüller, Salvatorians (S.D.S.) (1890)
 Fr. Angelus Münzloher, (S.D.S.) (1890 - 1906)
 Fr. Cristoforo Becker, (S.D.S.) (1906 – 1921)
 Fr. Louis Mathias, S.D.B. (December 15, 1922 – July 9, 1934 see below)

 Bishops of Shillong

 Louis Mathias, S.D.B. (see above 9 July 1934 – 25 March 1935), later Metropolitan Archbishop of Madras (India) (1935.03.25 – 1952.11.13) and Metropolitan Archbishop of (renamed) Madras and Mylapore(India) (1952.11.13 – 1965.08.02)
 Stephen Ferrando, S.D.B. (26 November 1935 – 26 June 1969); previously Bishop of Krishnagar (India) (1934.07.09 – 1935.11.26), later Titular Archbishop of Troina (1969.06.26 – 1978.06.21)

 Metropolitan Archbishops of Gauhati–Shillong

 Hubert D Rosario, S.D.B. (1969.06.26 – 1970.01.22 see below), previously Bishop of Dibrugarh (India) (1964.07.06 – 1969.06.26)

 Metropolitan Archbishops of Shillong – Gauhati

 Hubert D’Rosario, S.D.B. (as above 26 June 1969 – 30 March 1992 see below)

 Metropolitan Archbishops of Shillong

 Hubert D’Rosario, S.D.B. (as above 30 March 1992 – 30 August 1994)
 Tarcisius Resto Phanrang, S.D.B. (2 August 1995 – 5 May 1999), previously Titular Bishop of Corniculana & Auxiliary Bishop of Shillong (India) (1990.06.11 – 1995.08.02)
 Dominic Jala, S.D.B. (22 December 1999 – 10 October 2019)
Victor Lyngdoh (28 December 2020 – Present)

Ecclesiastical Province of Shillong 
The Province of Shillong comprises the following suffragan dioceses that has Shillong as its metropolitan see:
 Agartala
 Aizawl
 Jowai
 Nongstoin
 Tura

Saints and causes for canonisation
 Ven. Stephen Ferrando
 Servant of God Constantine Vendrame, SDB
 Lorenz Hopfenmuller (Otto)

References

Sources and external links

 GCatholic.org, with incumbent biography links 
 Catholic Hierarchy 
  Archdiocese website

Roman Catholic dioceses in India
Christianity in Meghalaya
Religious organizations established in 1889
Roman Catholic dioceses and prelatures established in the 19th century
1889 establishments in India